George Skirrow Beecroft (16 November 1809 – 18 March 1869) was a British Conservative Party politician and ironmaster.

Family
Born in 1809, Beecroft was the son of George Beecroft and Mary Audus. He first married his cousin Septima Garland Butler, daughter of Thomas Butler and Anne Beecroft in 1835. Together, they had two children. The first died in infancy, and the second, Septima, died in 1868. His wife, Septima, died in 1837.

In 1842, he married Mary Isabella Beaumont, daughter of George Beaumont. Together, they had two children: George Audus Beaumont (1844–1873) and Mary Alice, who died in infancy.

Early life
Beecroft was educated for a mercantile life at Horton House, in Bradford, until he was 17. He then moved into the iron trade, working with his father and uncle, Thomas Butler (senior), at Kirkstall Forge, eventually becoming a partner.

In 1841, he entered into partnership with his cousins - John Octavius Butler, Thomas Butler (junior), and Ambrose Edward Butler - at Beecroft, Butler and Co, before retiring in 1855.

Political career
Beecroft began his career as a member of the Leeds Town Council in 1849, holding office there until 1856. Outside of this, he was also President of the Leeds Conservative Association, a surveyor of highways, a churchwarden, and an active member of the Leeds Chamber of Commerce.

He was elected a Liberal-Conservative - nominally a Conservative - MP for Leeds at a by-election in 1857 - with politics supporting the Church of England, encouraging popular education, and extending the franchise - and held the seat until he stood down at the 1868 general election, owing to ill health.

Other activities
Beecroft was also a Justice of the Peace and Deputy Lieutenant of the West Riding of Yorkshire.

References

External links
 

Conservative Party (UK) MPs for English constituencies
Deputy Lieutenants of the West Riding of Yorkshire
UK MPs 1857–1859
UK MPs 1859–1865
UK MPs 1865–1868
1809 births
1869 deaths